Suku is a Bantu language of the Democratic Republic of the Congo.

There is some debate about its classification. Nurse & Philippson (2003) accept its traditional classification in the Yaka branch of Bantu.

References

Yaka languages
Languages of the Democratic Republic of the Congo